Carbonyl iron is a highly pure (97.5% for grade S, 99.5+% for grade R) iron, prepared by chemical decomposition of purified iron pentacarbonyl. It usually has the appearance of grey powder, composed of spherical microparticles. Most of the impurities are carbon, oxygen, and nitrogen.

BASF invented carbonyl iron powder in 1925 and claims to be the world's leading producer. In 1934, BASF was also involved in the development of the very first magnetic tapes used by the AEG Magnetophon tape recorder.  Carbonyl iron became the first magnetic recording oxide (although quickly replaced in 1936 by iron oxide).

In electronics, carbonyl iron is used to manufacture magnetic cores for high-frequency coils and in production of some ferrites. Spherical particles manufactured of carbonyl iron are used as a component of the radar absorbing materials used by the military, in stealth vehicles, for example. Other uses are in powder metallurgy, metal injection molding, and in various specialty products.

Powdered cores made of carbonyl iron have high stability of parameters across a wide range of temperatures and magnetic flux levels, with excellent Q factors between 50 kHz and 200 MHz. A popular application is in broadband inductors, especially in high-power applications.

In pharmaceutics, carbonyl iron powder is used to treat iron deficiency and as an iron dietary supplement. In 2017 carbonyl iron powder was reported as an effective reductant for aromatic nitro groups in water, an important reaction used in the synthesis of pharmaceuticals.

Particles of carbonyl iron (20–40%) suspended in a carrier fluid (60–80%) are used as a magnetorheological fluid.

See also
 Carbonyl nickel, a pure nickel prepared by decomposition of nickel carbonyl

References

Iron